Kikthawenund (1757–1831), also known as William Anderson, was a leader of the Unalatchgo Lenape people. The city of Anderson in Indiana is named after him.

Early life

Anderson was born along the banks of the Susquehanna River in or about what is today Marietta, Pennsylvania close to what was then called Anderson's Ferry. The Ferry was operated by his father, John Anderson, a man of Swedish descent. John Anderson was married to a daughter of the Lenape chief Netawatwees. This woman's name has not been recorded. 

William Anderson married young. In 1784 after his first wife had died he married Ahkechlungunaqua. They had three children together including Mekinges Conner.

Little is recorded of Anderson's early life. He had moved to what is now Ohio by the 1790s and was one of 14 Lenape leaders to sign the Treaty of Greenville. It was about then that Anderson moved to the site that was later named after him: Anderson, Indiana. The move seems not to have happened until 1798 based on later statements of Anderson's son Sarcoxie. Anderson built a log house within the current boundaries of the city of Anderson.

Chief
In 1806 an assembly was held at Anderson's village where he was recognized as chief by those present. In 1811 Anderson refused to back Tecumseh. Later that year Anderson and his followers relocated to Piqua, Ohio at the urging of William Henry Harrison. In 1815, Anderson returned to his village in Indiana, which had been burned by the U.S. Army while he was away, and began to rebuild it. In 1818 Anderson was one of the signatories of a treaty at St. Mary's, Ohio in which the Lenape agreed to leave Indiana and relocate west of the Mississippi.

In 1821 Anderson along with about 1,350 other Lenape relocated from Indiana to the banks of the Current River in Missouri. In 1830 Anderson and his followers relocated to what is now Kansas, where he died the following year.

Sources
article on Chief Anderson

1757 births
1831 deaths
Lenape people
Native American people from Indiana
Native American people from Pennsylvania
People from Marietta, Pennsylvania